USS Iwo Jima (LHD-7) is a  of the United States Navy. The ship was named for the Battle of Iwo Jima of World War II. The ship was commissioned in 2001 and is in service.

Construction and career
Fabrication work for Iwo Jima began at Ingalls shipyard on 3 September 1996, and the ship's keel was laid on 12 December 1997. At the keel laying ceremony, United States Army Captain Jacklyn H. Lucas, who was awarded the Medal of Honor for his actions during while serving as a Marine at the Battle of Iwo Jima, placed his Medal of Honor citation in the hull of the ship, where it remains today. She was launched on 4 February 2000. USS Iwo Jima was christened by her sponsor, Mrs. Zandra Krulak, wife of General Charles C. Krulak, the former Commandant of the Marine Corps, in Pascagoula, Mississippi on 25 March 2000. The commissioning crew moved aboard in April 2001, and made the ship's maiden voyage on 23 June 2001, accompanied by more than 2,000 World War II veterans – many of them survivors of the Battle of Iwo Jima. She was commissioned a week later in Pensacola, Florida, on 30 June 2001.

Shortly thereafter, the ship and crew began an accelerated Inter Deployment Training Cycle, which tested virtually every system on board in realistic combat conditions. Iwo Jima was also the first ship on the waterfront open to the public after the terrorist attacks of 11 September 2001. In 2002, Iwo Jima participated in Fleet Week in New York City.

Ship's history

2003

Iwo Jima and the Marines of the 26th Marine Expeditionary Unit (26 MEU) along with two other amphibious assault ships formed the Iwo Jima Amphibious Ready Group. Iwo Jima left port on 4 March 2003 in support of Operation Enduring Freedom and deployed Marines in April 2003 from the Mediterranean Sea into Northern Iraq for the Iraq War. In July 2003, Iwo Jima deployed to the coast of Liberia as part of JTF Liberia in response to the Second Liberian Civil War. During this operation, the Southern European Task Force (SETAF) as the command element of JTF Liberia and Iwo Jima with the 26 MEU landed Marines in Liberia to perform humanitarian assessments. "At its height, JTF Liberia consisted of over 5,000 service members from the SETAF headquarters, the 26th Marine Expeditionary Unit, the three-ship Iwo Jima Amphibious Ready Group, 3rd Air Force's 398th Air Expeditionary Group, U.S. Army Europe's 21st Theater Support Command, and Army Special Forces."

2004-2005
In 2004, Iwo Jima participated in Fleet Week. Iwo Jima served as the 2nd Fleet flagship in 2005, based out of Norfolk, Virginia.

Hurricane Katrina

On 31 August 2005, Iwo Jima was sortied to the Gulf of Mexico to provide disaster relief and to conduct support operations in the wake of Hurricane Katrina. Iwo Jima sailed up the Mississippi River to the city of New Orleans to directly support relief operations and act as the central command center for all federal, state and local disaster recovery operations.

During this critical period, Iwo Jima also served as the region's only fully functional air field for helicopter operations, conducting over one thousand flight deck operations; provided hot meals, showers, drinking water, and berthing to thousands of National Guardsmen and relief workers; provided medical services, including first aid and surgical services, for disaster victims; and conducted clean-up operations in the city and suburbs of New Orleans.

Iwo Jima served as flagship for the Commander-in-Chief, George W. Bush, during Hurricane Katrina Joint Task Force, and is only the second Navy ship to have been presented the flag of the President of the United States.

2006
On 6 June 2006, Iwo Jima left her homeport of Norfolk, Virginia, and began a regularly scheduled six-month deployment to the U.S. European Command and U.S. Central Command area of responsibilities, as flagship for the Iwo Jima Expeditionary Strike Group, encompassing 6,000 sailors and Marines. The ship was also a part of the evacuation effort of American citizens from the conflict in Lebanon.

News reports on 15 July 2006 stated that Iwo Jima, flagship of the 24th Marine Expeditionary Unit, would be used to evacuate U. S. citizens from Lebanon after the Israeli Defense Force made the Beirut International Airport unusable through bombing its runways and fuel storage areas.

2007
On 16 February 2007, Iwo Jima was awarded the 2006 Battle "E" award.

2009-2012
In 2009, 2010, and 2011, Iwo Jima participated at the annual Fleet Week in New York City.

On 3 November 2010, Iwo Jima was deployed to Haiti in anticipation of providing humanitarian assistance due to an impending Tropical Storm Tomas.

On 27 March 2012, Iwo Jima was deployed as part of the Iwo Jima Amphibious Ready Group with Marines from the 24th Marine Expeditionary Unit supporting maritime security operations and security cooperation efforts in the U.S. 5th and 6th Fleet areas of responsibility.

On 11 April 2012, an MV-22 from VMM-261 crashed near Agadir, Morocco, during a joint training exercise after taking off from USS Iwo Jima. Two US Marine crew chiefs were killed and the two pilots were seriously injured.

Early in May 2012, Iwo Jima was operating in the Gulf of Aqaba and in the south of the Red Sea. In November 2012, Iwo Jima was dispatched to the eastern Mediterranean, during escalating warfare between Israel and Hamas, in case the evacuation of U.S. citizens from Israel was required, delaying the scheduled return of Iwo Jima to Norfolk.

2014
In August 2014, Iwo Jima shifted homeport to Mayport.

2015

2016
In October 2016, Iwo Jima sailed to Haiti to relieve , assisting victims of Hurricane Matthew.

2018

In October and November 2018, Iwo Jima participated in NATO's Exercise Trident Juncture 2018 in Norway.

2021

In December 2021, Iwo Jima shifted homeports from Naval Station Mayport to Naval Station Norfolk as a part of the Navy's plan consolidate the East Coast-based amphibious ships to the Norfolk area.

Motto

The ship's motto, "Uncommon Valor", is based on Fleet Admiral Chester W. Nimitz's words when he spoke of Sailors and Marines who fought at Iwo Jima: "Among the Americans who served on Iwo Jima, uncommon valor was a common virtue."

References

External links

Maritimequest USS Iwo Jima LHD-7 Photo Gallery
USS Iwo Jima history at U.S. Carriers

Wasp-class amphibious assault ships
Amphibious warfare vessels of the United States
Ships built in Pascagoula, Mississippi
2001 ships